Misremembered (foaled 15 April 2006) is an American Thoroughbred racehorse.

Background
Bred by his trainer, Bob Baffert, he is out of Beyond Perfection, a daughter of Quack (by T.V. Lark), who won the Del Mar Debutante Stakes in 1990. His sire is the undefeated Candy Ride. He is owned by Jill Baffert, wife of the trainer, and George Jacobs, owner of Georgee's Pizza in La Canada, California.

Racing career

2009 season

Misremembered did not race at age two. At age three, he broke his maiden in his second start. The only time he finished out of the money was in his first race, where he finished. His major race win came in the grade II Swaps Stakes, going wire to wire. The colt also took the grade II  Indiana Derby in 2009, setting a stakes record.

2010 Season
Misremembered made his four year debut in early February in the Grade II Strub Stakes at Santa Anita. He lost by a neck.

On  March 6, 2010, he won the $750,000 Santa Anita Handicap, holding off fast-closing Neko Bay. The victory was Misremembered's first after three consecutive runner-up finishes (in the Clark Handicap, Malibu Stakes, and Strub Stakes).

2011 Season

Misremembered raced once as a five year old, winning the Santana Mile Stakes at Santa Anita by five lengths in 1:33.50.

Stud record
Misremembered stands at Barton Thoroughbreds, Santa Ynez, California

Pedigree

References 

2006 racehorse births
Racehorses bred in Kentucky
Racehorses trained in the United States
Thoroughbred family 2